The 2006 Kyoto gubernatorial election was held on 9 April 2006 to elect the next governor of , a prefecture of Japan located in the Kansai region of Honshu island. Governor Keiji Yamada was re-elected for a second term, defeating Kinugasa Yoko with 65.62% of the vote.

Candidates 

Keiji Yamada, 52, incumbent (since 2002), former Home Affairs Ministry bureaucrat, former vice governor of the prefecture. He was supported by the LDP, Komeito party, as well as the opposition DPJ and SDP.
Kinugasa Yoko, endorsed by JCP.

Results

References 

2006 elections in Japan
Kyoto gubernational elections
Politics of Kyoto Prefecture
April 2006 events in Japan